Jaclyn Frances Raulerson (born August 28, 1990) is an American beauty pageant titleholder from Plant City, Florida who was named Miss Florida 2010. She represented Florida in the 2011 Miss America pageant, where she was a top 7 finalist for the Quality of Life award, recognizing her work with her platform, "Stop Bullying Now!"

Raulerson graduated from University of Florida with a degree in Telecommunications. She is an anchor/host in South Carolina where she resides with her husband.

References

External links
 

Miss America 2011 delegates
University of Central Florida alumni
People from Plant City, Florida
Living people
1990 births
University of Florida alumni
Durant High School (Florida) alumni